Jeff MacIntyre is an Emmy Award-winning television producer, cameraman and editor known for documentaries and his work with ABC News. Since 1990, he has owned the Los Angeles-based production company, Content Media Group.

Awards 
Jeff MacIntyre won all five categories he was nominated for at the 2018 Los Angeles Emmy Awards on July 28, 2018.

He also received two Los Angeles Emmy Award Awards in July, 2014 for The Legacy of Heart Mountain, in the categories of Outstanding Editor, Programming and Outstanding Videographer, Programming. In total, he has been nominated 51 times and has won 21 Los Angeles Emmy Awards in addition to 10 Edward R. Murrow Awards for his work with ABC News.

See also  
 David Ono

References

External links 
 Content Media Group
 

Living people
Year of birth missing (living people)
American film producers